Conculus is a genus of araneomorph spiders in the family Anapidae, first described by T. Komatsu in 1940. On 30 May 2019, two new species were described, with both coming from Southeast Asia.

Species
, the World Spider Catalog accepted the following species:
Conculus grossus (Forster, 1959) – New Guinea
Conculus lyugadinus (Kishida, 1940) – China, Korea, Japan
Conculus sagadaensis (Zhang & Lin, sp. n.) - Philippines
Conculus simboggulensis (Paik, 1971) – Korea
Conculus yaoi (Zhang & Lin, sp. n.) - Indonesia

References

Anapidae
Araneomorphae genera
Spiders of Asia
Taxa named by Kyukichi Kishida